Beating Heart may refer to:

 Cardiac cycle of the heart
 Heart sounds

Film
 Beating Heart (film), a 1940 French film directed by Henri Decoin
 Beating Heart (TV series), a 2005 South Korean television drama series

Music
 "Beating Heart" (Ellie Goulding song), 2014
 "Beating Heart", English-language version of 1980 Gyllene Tider song "När vi två blir en"

Unicode
 💓 (U+1F493), Unicode BEATING HEART symbol, see Heart symbol#Computer code

See also
 Heartbeat (disambiguation)
 Bleeding heart (disambiguation)